Patrycja Durska-Mruk (born May 24, 1977 in Poznań) is a Polish actress. She appeared in the comedy television series Bao-Bab, czyli zielono mi in 2003. She has been a member of the company at Ludowy Theatre since 2002.

Filmography 
 2000: Duże zwierzę
 2000: 6 dni strusia 
 2001: Poranek kojota 
 2001: Na dobre i na złe 
 2003: Na Wspólnej 
 2003: Bao-Bab, czyli zielono mi 
 2005-2007: Magda M. 
 2009: Przystań 
 2010: Ratownicy 
 2011: Hotel 52
 2012: Wszystkie kobiety Mateusza
 2012−2014: Medics  
 2013: Mój biegun 
 2014: Friends 
 2014: Pani z przedszkola

References

External links

1977 births
Living people
Actors from Poznań
Polish actresses